The town has a number of secondary, and higher secondary educational institutions, plus a number of Polytechnics, and Engineering Colleges in the vicinity. The Govt. HSS in the town is one of the oldest schools in the entire state. It was established long before in the 1890s. It has churned out a number of proficient people, who have excelled in every field.

List of colleges 

 NIMS Dental College, Aralumoodu, Neyyattinkara
 Technology Management Corridor (TMC), Near Sub-jail, Chemparathivila, NTA [Institute of Human Resource Development (IHRD), Government of Kerala]
 College of Applied Science, Dhanuvachapuram (5 km from Town) (Institute of Human Resource Development (IHRD), Government of Kerala)
 Ezhuthachan College of Pharmaceutical Sciences, Marayamuttom
 VTM NSS college, Dhanuvachapuram (5 km from Town)
 K N M Government Arts & Science College, Kanjiramkulam (5 km from Town)
 Government Arts & Science College, Kulathoor
 University Institute of Technology, Neyyattinkara Centre (2 km from Town)
 Government Polytechnic College, Perumpazhuthoor (3 km from Town)
 Regional Institute of Aviation, Pravachambalam (6 km from Town)
 CSI College of Education, Parasala
 PRS College of Engineering and Technology, Paliyode
 Christian College, Kattakada (7 km from Neyyattinkara town border, however, this college comes under newly formed Kattakada Taluk)
 Sree Krishna College of Pharmacy & Research Centre, Parassala

List of schools

St.Teresa's Convent GHSS, Convent Road, Neyyattinkara: Classes from Kindergarten to Plus Two. Students can opt either ICSE (Indian Certificate of Secondary Education) Syllabus in English Medium or State Syllabus in English / Malayalam Medium. Boys are also admitted up to 7th standard in State Syllabus. This school was established in the year 1928. English medium school started in 1931. Higher secondary section added in 2002. I.C.S.E. wing started in 2007. 2013 batch Indian Administrative Service (IAS) first rank holder in India, Ms. Haritha V Kumar is the former student of this school.
 Government Higher Secondary School, Near Govt. Hospital Jn (State Syllabus - English / Malayalam Medium)
 Government Girls' Higher Secondary School, Govt. Hospital Road (State Syllabus - English / Malayalam Medium)
 Sree Vidyadhiraja Vidya Nilayam Higher Secondary School, Convent Road (English Medium)
Viswabharathy Public School, Kanyakumari Road (CBSE Syllabus, English Medium)
 Junior Basic School (JBS), Neyyattinkara - State Syllabus, Malayalam Medium (Near Municipality & Fire Station buildings)
 St. Philip English Medium High School, T B Junction
 LMS HSS Amaravila, Near Amaravila Church
 Dr. G.R Public School, Ooruttukaala
 St. Mary’s H.S., Kamukincode
 Government High School, Perumpazhuthoor- 3 km from Town
 M.V Higher Secondary School, Arumanoor
 Government Higher Secondary School - Marayamuttom in Perumkadavila Panchayat
 Leo XIII Higher Secondary School, Pulluvila
 New Higher Secondary School, Nellimoodu
 St. Chrysostom's G.H.S.S Nellimoodu
 PKS Higher Secondary School, Kanjiramkulam
 Government High School, Kanjiramkulam
 Javahar Central School, Kanjiramkulam
 Government High School, Anavoor
 Government Higher Secondary School, Keezharoor
 St. Helen's Girls' Higher Secondary School, Lourdupuram
 Srisankara Centralschool, Poozhikunnu, Venkadampu

References

Neyyattinkara